Kassar is an Arabic surname with two distinctive and different pronunciation and meaning, as قصار (with the qaf) or كسار (with the kaf). It may also carry the definite article as Al Kassar (being القصار or الكسار according to the qaf/kaf origin).  

Notable people with the surname include:

with the qaf origin (قصار)
Adnan Kassar (born 1930), Lebanese lawyer, businessman and politician
Nadim Kassar, Lebanese businessman and banker
Mario Kassar (born 1951), Lebanese film producer and industry executive 
Mireille Kassar (born 1963), Lebanese artist

with the kaf origin (كسار)
Ahmed Al-Kassar, Saudi Arabian football player
Fahad Al-Kassar (born 1973), Emirati football referee
Monzer al-Kassar (born 1945), also known as the "Prince of Marbella", Syrian international arms dealer
Sami Kassar, Saudi Arabian football player

Others
Ami Kassar, American small business advocate and loan broker
Ray Kassar (1928–2017), American businessman and entrepreneur. President of  Burlington Industries, Atari Inc. and others

See also
Cassar, variant of Kassar, predominantly in Malta, but also in the Arab World
Qassar (disambiguation)
Qassar Khusayfah, group of islets in Bahrain
Qassar al Qulay`ah, an island of Bahrain

Arabic-language surnames